Understand This is the third album by rapper Grand Puba of Brand Nubian. The album received little critical and commercial attention, especially when compared to his previous efforts Reel to Reel and 2000. Understand This features the singles "Understand This", "Up & Down", and "Issues".

Track listing 
All tracks produced by Grand Puba except Track 15, produced by Lord Jamar

Chart positions

References 

2001 albums
Grand Puba albums